Prince Bagrat III (died 1028) was a Georgian prince of the Bagrationi dynasty from Tao-Klarjeti.

He was son of Prince Sumbat III of Klarjeti.

Prince Bagrat rebelled against King Bagrat III of Georgia and proclaimed himself as King of Klarjeti. He took refuge in Constantinople.

In 1028, the new king Bagrat IV of Georgia imprisoned him and he died during the captivity.

References 

1028 deaths
Monarchs of Georgia
Bagrationi dynasty of Klarjeti
11th-century rulers in Europe
11th-century people from Georgia (country)
Year of birth unknown